Znamensky District  is an administrative and municipal district (raion), one of the twenty-three in Tambov Oblast, Russia. It is located in the southwestern central part of the oblast. The district borders with Tambovsky District in the north, Sampursky District in the east, Tokaryovsky District in the south, and with Morshansky District in the west. Its administrative center is the urban locality (a work settlement) of Znamenka. Population: 18,405 (2010 Census);  The population of Znamenka accounts for 33.5% of the district's total population.

Notable residents 

Natalia Pushkina (1812–1863), wife of the poet Alexander Pushkin, born in the village of Karian

References

Notes

Sources

Districts of Tambov Oblast